Castelspina is a comune (municipality) in the Province of Alessandria in the Italian region Piedmont, located about  southeast of Turin and about  southwest of Alessandria.

Notable people
 Giovanni Canestri (born 1918), Archbishop Emeritus of Genoa.

References

Cities and towns in Piedmont